The castra of Ocna Sibiului was a fort in the Roman province of Dacia. The fort was built and abandoned in the 2nd century AD. Its ruins were unearthed on the Topârcii Hill in Ocna Sibiului (Romania).

See also
List of castra

Notes

External links
Roman castra from Romania - Google Maps / Earth
Roman legionary fortresses in Romania
Ancient history of Transylvania
Historic monuments in Sibiu County